Conrad Homfeld (born December 25, 1951, in Houston, Texas) is an American show jumping competitor and Olympic champion.

Olympics
Homfeld qualified for the 1980 U.S. Olympic team but did not compete due to the U.S. Olympic Committee's boycott of the 1980 Summer Olympics in Moscow, Russia. He was one of 461 athletes to receive a Congressional Gold Medal instead. At the 1984 Olympic Games in Los Angeles, Homfeld won the gold medal as part of the United States team in Team jumping, with the horse Abdullah. He received a silver medal in Individual jumping.  He later transitioned to a career in show jumping course design.

References

External links

1951 births
Living people
American male equestrians
Equestrians at the 1984 Summer Olympics
Olympic gold medalists for the United States in equestrian
Medalists at the 1984 Summer Olympics
Congressional Gold Medal recipients
People from Houston
Sportspeople from Texas
20th-century American people